Pilz Glacier (also known as Pit Glacier) is in Wenatchee National Forest in the U.S. state of Washington and is on the north slopes Luahna Peak. An arête separates Pilz Glacier from Butterfly Glacier to the west.

See also
List of glaciers in the United States

References

Glaciers of the North Cascades
Glaciers of Chelan County, Washington
Glaciers of Washington (state)